Jizzy Pearl (born James Wilkinson, March 17, 1958) is an American hard rock and heavy metal singer. He first fronted the band Data Clan, which eventually became Love/Hate. Pearl has also sung for L.A. Guns, Ratt, Adler's Appetite, Quiet Riot and other, lesser known acts.

Pearl is known for, in the words of KNAC.com, his "gritty-sounding blues-influenced" vocals.

Biography 
In the late 1980s, Pearl sang for Love/Hate, which achieved notoriety for performances as the house band at the Whisky a Go Go in Hollywood. The group subsequently signed to Columbia Records.

In early 2007, Pearl announced he would reunite with Love/Hate after ten years, on February 24, 2007, at Club Vodka in Hollywood, California, to perform their classic record Blackout in the Red Room in its entirety.

In 2013, Pearl joined Quiet Riot, replacing then vocalist Scott Vokoun. The band decided to record a new album with Pearl that they set for release in early 2014.

That effort became Quiet Riot 10 (also alternatively known as just 10), which was the twelfth studio album by the heavy metal band and featured a mix of songs with Pearl as well as live tracks with founder vocalist Kevin DuBrow. The album came out on June 27, 2014. It has received mixed to positive reviews from publications such as KNAC.com and Music Enthusiast Magazine.

Pearl quit Quiet Riot at the end of 2016 to focus on his solo work, and was replaced by Seann Nichols, who was subsequently replaced by James Durbin in March 2017. Durbin quit in September 2019, and Pearl re-joined.

Discography

References

External links 
Jizzy Pearl – Official website

1958 births
Living people
American rock singers
Glam metal musicians
L.A. Guns members
Ratt members
Adler's Appetite members
Quiet Riot members
Sin City Sinners members